Caryodidae is a taxonomic family of air-breathing land snails, terrestrial pulmonate gastropod mollusks in the superfamily Acavoidea (according to the taxonomy of the Gastropoda by Bouchet & Rocroi, 2005).

This family is endemic to eastern Australia.

This family has no subfamilies (according to the taxonomy of the Gastropoda by Bouchet & Rocroi, 2005).

This family was previously treated as a subfamily of the family Acavidae.

Genera 
The family Caryodidae has no subfamilies.

Genera and species within this family include:

 Anoglypta Martens, 1860
 Brazieresta Iredale, 1933
 Caryodes Albers, 1850 - type genus
 Hedleyella Iredale, 1914
 Pandofella Iredale, 1933
 Pedinogyra Albers, 1860
 Pedinogyra allani Iredale, 1937
 Pedinogyra effossa Iredale, 1937
 Pedinogyra hayii (Griffith & Pidgeon, 1833)
 Pedinogyra minor (Mousson, 1869)
 Pedinogyra hayii (Reeve, 1852)
 Pedinogyra rotabilis (Reeve, 1852)
 Pygmipanda Iredale, 1933 includes Pygmipanda atomata

References

Further reading 
 Murphy M. J. (2002). "Observations on the behaviour of the Australian land snail Hedleyella falconeri (Grey, 1834) (Pulmonata : Caryodidae) using the spool-and-line tracking technique". Molluscan Research 22(2): 149-164. , PDF.

External links